What Goes Around – Greatest & Latest is the eleventh studio album by rock singer-songwriter and bassist Suzi Quatro, released in 1995 by CMC International Records. It features re-recordings of her original recordings, spanning from the 1970s and features four new tracks, one a cover version of Bruce Springsteen's song "Born to Run".

Critical reception

Reviewing for AllMusic, critic Dave Thompson wrote of the album "One of those odd collections that flags its contents with a vague "greatest and latest" subtitle, but it's only when you get it home that you really discover what you have." adding that "her latest band does have a great time trying to recapture the manic energy of the original recordings, which may or may not do it for the casual listener."

Track listing
All songs written and composed by Mike Chapman and Nicky Chinn, except where noted.

 "Devil Gate Drive"
 "The Wild One"
 "The Race Is On"
 "What Goes Around" (Suzi Quatro)
 "Can the Can"
 "She's in Love with You"
 "Stumblin' In"
 "I May Be Too Young"
 "Empty Rooms" (Quatro)
 "48 Crash"
 "Make Love to Me" (Quatro)
 "Born to Run" (Bruce Springsteen)
 "Four Letter Words"
 "Tear Me Apart"
 "Your Mama Won't Like Me"
 "Rock Hard"
 "Mama's Boy" (Quatro, Len Tuckey)
 "If You Can't Give Me Love"

Personnel
 Suzi Quatro – lead vocals, harmony vocals, bass guitar
 Robbie Gladwell – guitars, backing vocals
 Andy Dowding – drums, percussion
 Reg Webb – keyboards, piano, backing vocals
 Ray Beavis – saxophone, backing vocals
 Dick Hanson – trumpet, flugelhorn
 Chris Gower – trombone

References

1995 albums
Suzi Quatro albums